The Las Vegas Silver Streaks were a professional basketball franchise based in Las Vegas, Nevada  from 1988-1990. The team played its inaugural seasons in the World Basketball League before folding.  The Silver Streaks won the first World Basketball League championship in 1988, defeating the Chicago Express 102-95 in the title game. They were one of only three teams to ever win a WBL championship.
Creation of a league franchise team for Las Vegas, NV was facilitated by former Oakland A's executive Fred Kuenzi. He stayed on and served as a General Manager and promotions director for season 1.

The Silver Streaks played its home games at the Thomas & Mack Center.  Former UNLV stars Freddie Banks, Anthony Jones and Mark Wade played for the club.

Sources
http://www.apbr.org/wbl88-92.html

World Basketball League teams
Basketball teams in Nevada